Goran Blažević (born 7 June 1986), nicknamed Šiljo, is a Croatian retired football goalkeeper.

Club career

Early career
A product of the famous HNK Hajduk Split youth academy and one-time Croatian U16, U17 and U19 national team player, Goran began his senior career in 2004 on loan at HNK Trogir, then playing in the 1. Županijska liga Splitsko-dalmatinska. The club topped the table and moved to the 3. HNL – South and Goran played another season there. Dismissed from Hajduk as surplus, Goran played two more seasons in 3. HNL – South, first for NK Zagora Unešić and then NK Junak Sinj, where he was the star player in a season that resulted in their promotion to 2. HNL, catching the attention of some 1. HNL clubs.

HNK Šibenik
In 2008, Blažević moved to HNK Šibenik, quickly becoming a first team player (50 first team caps in his first two seasons at the club). With HNK Šibenik in financial difficulties, Blažević cancelled his contract with the club in December 2011.

Hajduk Split
In January 2012, Blažević signed a four-year contract with Hajduk Split. As Hajduk's former first choice goalkeeper Subašić had just left the club for French Ligue 2 side AS Monaco, Blažević immediately was bestowed the first choice at the historic club.

Levski Sofia
In September 2013 Blažević passed successfully his medical and signed a 2-year contract with Bulgarian side Levski Sofia. He quickly became first choice at the expense of Plamen Iliev, but gradually lost his starting spot following the appointment of Antoni Zdravkov.

Torpedo Moscow
In the summer of 2014, Blažević moved to the Russianside FC Torpedo Moscow, where he took on the role of backup to Yuri Zhevnov. He went on to play only one game for the club, in the Russian Cup, a 2-0 away loss to CSKA Moscow, before succumbing to an Achilles tendon injury requiring surgery at the start of 2015. Blažević was released by the club that summer.

Slaven Belupo
At the start of 2016, Blažević signed to Slaven Belupo in Croatia, playing only two matches before a shoulder injury forced him off the pitch until the end of the season. Returning in the summer of 2016. At the start of the season, Blažević, not fully healed, lost the starting place to Antun Marković, but after full recovery, took it over in September 2016. Marković would ultimately secure said position the following year, and Blažević would stay second-choice until his contract expired at the end of 2017.

Return to Hajduk Split
In September 2018, Blažević was signed by his former club HNK Hajduk Split, requiring a backup goalkeeper for Josip Posavec and Marin Ljubić, due to Tomislav Duka's injury. In October 2018, after Posavec was injured and Ljubić relegated to the reserve team, Blažević stepped in, featuring in 5 league matches and one cup match. Following Posavec and Duka's recovery in December 2018, Blažević was relegated again to a backup role, before he was released from the club after his second one-season contract expired at the end of June 2020.

International career
While in the HNK Hajduk Split academy, Blažević was capped four times for the Croatia U16 team, and once for the Croatia U17, as backup to Filip Lončarić.

In September 2009 he received his first call-up for Croatia, for friendly match vs. Liechtenstein. However, he was on the bench, while Danijel Subašić played the whole match.

In May 2010 he received his second call-up, for friendly matches against Austria, Wales, and Estonia, following the injury of Vedran Runje. Being the third choice, after Danijel Subašić and Stipe Pletikosa, he didn't get his cap that time.

References

External links

 Profile at Levskisofia.info 

1986 births
Living people
Footballers from Split, Croatia
Association football goalkeepers
Croatian footballers
Croatia youth international footballers
HNK Trogir players
NK Zagora Unešić players
NK Junak Sinj players
HNK Šibenik players
HNK Hajduk Split players
PFC Levski Sofia players
FC Torpedo Moscow players
NK Slaven Belupo players
Croatian Football League players
First Professional Football League (Bulgaria) players
Croatian expatriate footballers
Expatriate footballers in Bulgaria
Croatian expatriate sportspeople in Bulgaria
Expatriate footballers in Russia
Croatian expatriate sportspeople in Russia